The 1998–99 Western Professional Hockey League season was the third season of the Western Professional Hockey League, a North American minor pro league. 17 teams participated in the regular season, and the Shreveport Mudbugs were the league champions.

Regular season

President's Cup-Playoffs

External links
 Season 1998/99 on hockeydb.com

Western Professional Hockey League seasons
WPHL